Robert Hutchins may refer to:

 Robert Maynard Hutchins (1899–1977), American educational philosopher
 Robert Owen Hutchins (1939–2009), American organic chemist and educator
 Bobby Hutchins (1925–1945), American child actor

See also
Robert Hutchings (fl. 1980s–2010s), former chair of the National Intelligence Council